Construction Site is a live action children's television series created by The Jim Henson Company in 1999, featuring a group of seven anthropomorphic construction vehicles. It was originally produced for and shown on CITV starting on September 10, 1999. In 2003, it was nominated for a Children's BAFTA for the Best Pre-School Live Action. Two 13-episode seasons were produced. Episodes are packaged as 52 x 10’ or 13 x 26’. The show is similar in concept to Thomas & Friends and Bob the Builder, albeit without any human characters and in a more realistic, less toylike visual style. The show had a range of video releases by Universal Australia.

The characters
The main characters consist of a range of different construction equipment. They are as follows:

 Diggs is a male blue Backhoe loader
 Bozer is a male red Bulldozer
 Scooch is a male orange Dumper
 Carrie is a female purple Forklift
 Carl is a male green Crane
 Lug is a male yellow Dump truck
 Maxine is a female brown Cement Mixer

There were also mentioned/visiting characters:
 Flatty the Flatbed
 Skatch the Dumper
 Big Rig the Large Dump truck
 Dumper the Jumper Truck
 Big Rig the "Supertruck"
 Kevin the Crane
 Truckzilla the Monster Truck

There are also other vehicles and machines:
 The Low Loader
 The Tall Crane
 The Conveyor Belt
 The Wrecking Ball Crane

Episodes

Season 1 (1999–2000)
 "Who's the Boss" – Carrie thinks she'd make just as good a boss as Bozer and when he gives her the chance she's determined to prove it.
 "Cool Fuel" – The machines must clear an old dumpsite to make way for a new car park in just one day.
 "What I Do Best" – When Diggs starts treating everyday jobs on the construction site as a competition, Bozer decides to introduce a real contest—the Machine Challenge
 "Carnival Capers" – On Maxine's mileage day, Bozer enlists the help of the others to organize a party to celebrate.
 "Big Bozer Is Watching" – Scooch is terrified to work on top of a tall building after spilling salt earlier in the day, as he believes it's bad luck.
 "Big Rig" – Lug scoffs when he sees the new machines pretending to be a superhero named Big Rig, but he might need some of those powers.
 "Listening Troubles" – When Bozer tells Diggs that he's full of good ideas he thinks he'll share them with Scooch and Carrie—but Carrie has her own ideas, and they bicker.
 "The Way of the Bodger" – Diggs learns the merits of doing a job properly after he does mediocre work to save time.
 "Look What I've Got" – Diggs is proud of his shiny new attachment. But when Bozer tells him it's needed on an important job, Diggs realizes that he doesn't know what it does.
 "Tread Carefully" – Diggs wears some new, fashionable treads, but his quest for fashion leaves Scooch in a tight spot.
 "A Good Mixer" – The new machines have a lot of bricks to move, so many in fact that Diggs thinks they could use a little help from Maxine.
 "Almost Famous" – When Diggs, Carrie and Scooch dig a trench in the wrong place they think they've struck oil and dream of riches.
 "Sunk" – When the younger machines accidentally knock a load of oil drums into the dock they are too scared to own up to their mistake.
 "What's the Plan" – Diggs and Scooch thing they're saving Bozer some time by digging a pond, but they put it in the wrong place.
 "Idle Time" – When there's cement mix to be moved and Carrie's feeling fired up, nothing can stop her—nothing except a dead battery that is.
 "A Riveting Story" – Carrie chooses to horse around when the machines are clearing out an old dock, and has to be rescued by Carl.
 "There's No Place Like Home" – Preoccupied because he misses his birth site, Carl almost drops a pipe on Diggs, leading the others to try and cheer him up.
 "Truckmate" – Diggs is jealous when Scooch chooses to work with Carrie instead of him, so Diggs impersonates Carrie to win back his friend.
 "Grown Up for a Day" – When Diggs saves Carl from a nasty accident, the older machines decide it's time he started hanging out with them.
 "Mid-Mileage Crisis" – After reflecting on his carefree youth, Lug decides that he's not ready for old age and joins Diggs and Scooch for some 'top gear' fun.
 "Loud and Clear" – Scooch's voice is too quiet to stop Lug from crashing, and Scooch worries that the older truck will never forgive him.
 "Junkyard" – Diggs frightens Carrie and Schooch on a junkyard run with tales of a scary monster named "Truckzilla."
 "From Start to Finish" – Diggs, Carrie and Scooch are tired of the old machines always telling them what to do, and want to prove to Bozer they can work on their own
 "Out with the Old" –  Bozer tells the machines that it's "out with the old and in with the new," to Carl and Lug's chagrin.
 "Feeling Flat" – Scooch wants to find something he can do that Diggs can't. But when he tries to max out his load all he ends up with is a flat tire.
 "One Roll at the Time" – Diggs discovers Bozer is scared of water, but in an effort to help Bozer conquer his fear, Diggs ends up in trouble.

Season 2 (2001–2003)

 "Carrie's Pallets" – Jealous when the bigger machines get to landscape a new park, Carrie decides to invent her own forklifting style.
 "Carl Wash" – Carl's inventions are legendary...for being a disaster. And when he unveils his new Carl Wash, the young machines are his test dummies.
 "One Little Word" – Bozer gives Scooch the morning off so he'll be rested for a big job in the afternoon, but the other machines ask for his help and he doesn't get much rest.
 "Testing Behaviour" – It's time for the CCT (Construction Certificate Test) and Carrie's convinced she won't pass.
 "Bozer's Boo Boo" – When Diggs discovers that Bozer has accidentally dozed a load of gravel over some important bridge roads he faces a dilemma.
 "Don't Panic" – Bozer goes off site and leaves Carl in charge—which always leads to total chaos. So Maxine steps in to help.
 "Every Dumper's Dream" – When Lug tells Scooch that grading a road on your own is what every dumper dreams of, the little truck decides to do a bit of solo grading.
 "If Trucks Could Fly" – When a daredevil dump truck comes to town, Scooch is thrilled to find out that Lug used to be one himself.
 "I'm Having Fun Today" – Carrie teaches Diggs that even his boring job of moving stones can be fun when she turns it into a game.
 "Days of Blunder" – A site scattered with materials inspires Diggs to turn it into an obstacle course, and Scooch wonders if he's up to the challenge.
 "Mine All Mine" – Diggs, Scooch and Carrie gets themselves trapped in a collapsed mine.
 "Safe and Sound" – Working in the snowy mountains, Diggs chooses to engage in some dangerous thrills rather than put safety first.
 "Silencers Are Golden" – When Carl and Lug have a falling out, Diggs can't help but try to bring them back together.
 "The Call of the Forest" – Despite Bozer's warnings; Diggs plays a prank on Scooch, encouraging him to pursue the mysterious "the call of the forest.
 "Space Invaders" – Scooch would like a bit more space in the idle house but Diggs and Carrie aren't giving an inch.
 "Star Truck" – When the young machines decide to tell stories, Scooch shows that sometimes the smallest truck has the biggest imagination.
 "Going Solo" – With Bozer off-site, Diggs mistakenly thinks Maxine has told him it's OK to do a job on his own.
 "Magno Carrie" – Carrie doesn't understand how to work her flashy new recharger—so Diggs takes charge, despite the fact he has no idea what he's doing.
 "Crane of the Year" – Carl has to knock a chimney down on the site today, giving him a chance to show why he is nominated for Crane of the Year.
 "Parp Idle!" – Due to a wall of ice that Carl can't even shift, the machines get stuck on a slippery mountain road.
 "Building Bozer" – When Diggs overhears Bozer talking to himself, it seems that their beloved boss is going to be leaving.
 "Whodunnit" – The machines are shocked to find that during the night the new multistory parking garage they were building has been destroyed.
 "Emission Impossible" – A new dump truck has come to the site—Skatch. He's so exciting and fun that Diggs and Carrie seem to be ignoring their old pal, Scooch.
 "Hi Pitched Bozer" – Bozer returns from a servicing only to find that his deep voice has changed and is now high and squeaky.
 "Frozen Bozer" – On a cold day, Bozer reminds the machines to put in their antifreeze. Trouble is, he's so busy reminding everyone else that he forgets to put some in himself.
 "Fog" – The young machines procrastinate on a job, and pay the price when a thick fog rolls in.

Setting
The series was set around a large construction site, and the machines are rarely seen leaving its boundaries. There were no human characters due to the use of 
Muppet-like vehicles. The site consists of factories, a battery charge bay, a park, a dock, a few sheds, a tall bridge, a scrapyard, a mountain, a forest, and more.

Production

The models
The vehicle models are used by live-action animatronic puppet models. This is the first time The Jim Henson Company have used these, as these type of puppets were restricted to movies like Babe and Labyrinth.

External links
 
 Construction Site at Muppet Wiki

1999 American television series debuts
2003 American television series endings
1999 British television series debuts
2003 British television series endings
1990s American children's television series
2000s American children's television series
1990s British children's television series
2000s British children's television series
1990s preschool education television series
2000s preschool education television series
American preschool education television series
British preschool education television series
American television shows featuring puppetry
British television shows featuring puppetry
ITV children's television shows
Television series by The Jim Henson Company